Clap Hands, Here Comes Charlie! is a 1961 studio album by Ella Fitzgerald, with a jazz quartet led by Lou Levy.  The painting on the cover is by Jean Dubuffet. The liner notes are by Benny Green of the London Observer.

Track listing
For the 1961 Verve LP album, Verve V-4053 (Mono) & V6-4053 (Stereo)

Side One:
"A Night in Tunisia" (Dizzy Gillespie, Frank Paparelli) – 4:06
"You're My Thrill" (Sidney Clare, Jay Gorney) – 3:35
"My Reverie" (Larry Clinton, Claude Debussy) – 3:16
"Stella by Starlight" (Ned Washington, Victor Young) – 3:17
"'Round Midnight" (Bernie Hanighen, Thelonious Monk, Cootie Williams) – 3:28
"Jersey Bounce" (Tiny Bradshaw, Buddy Feyne, Edward Johnson, Bobby Plater) – 3:33
"Signing Off" (Leonard Feather, Jessyca Russell) – 3:45
Side Two:
"Cry Me a River" (Arthur Hamilton) – 4:13
"This Year's Kisses" (Irving Berlin) – 2:14
"Good Morning Heartache" (Ervin Drake, Dan Fisher, Irene Higginbotham) – 4:17
"(I Was) Born to Be Blue" (Mel Tormé, Bob Wells) – 2:42
"Clap Hands! Here Comes Charlie!" (Ballard MacDonald, Joseph Meyer, Billy Rose) – 2:41
"Spring Can Really Hang You Up the Most" (Fran Landesman, Tommy Wolf) – 6:13
"The Music Goes Round and Round" (Eddie Farley, Red Hodgson, Mike Riley) – 2:27

Bonus Tracks; Issued on the 1989 Verve-PolyGram CD Reissue, Verve-PolyGram 835 646-2 and DAT W.L.S.T. 1994 835 646 - 4

15. "The One I Love (Belongs to Somebody Else)" (Previously unreleased) (Isham Jones, Gus Kahn) – 2:12

16. "I Got a Guy" (Previously unreleased) (Marion Sunshine) – 3:43

17. "This Could Be the Start of Something Big" (Previously unreleased) (Steve Allen) – 2:43

Personnel 
Tracks 1 to 14; recorded 22–23 June 1961 in Los Angeles

Tracks 15 to 17; recorded 23 January 1961 in New York
 Ella Fitzgerald - vocals
 Lou Levy - piano
 Herb Ellis - guitar
 Joe Mondragon - bass on tracks 1-14 only
 Wilfred Middlebrooks - double bass on tracks 15-17 only
 Gus Johnson - drums

References 

1961 albums
Ella Fitzgerald albums
Verve Records albums
Albums produced by Norman Granz